Phil Cunningham may refer to:

Phil Cunningham (basketball) (born 1966), basketball coach  
Phil Cunningham (folk musician) (born 1960), Scottish accordionist 
Phil Cunningham (rock musician) (born 1974), English guitarist
Phil Cunningham (producer), executive producer of Jungle Beat and other animation